The Constituent National Assembly was the unicameral parliament of the Third Republic of Czechoslovakia from 1946 until 1948. Only one election was ever held, in May 1946.

The Constituent National Assembly was a successor to the Interim National Assembly. Democracy in Czechoslovakia ended in the Czechoslovak coup d'état of February 1948, where the Communist Party took power. Democracy was not restored until 41 years later.

Presidents of the Constituent National Assembly

References

External links
 Joint Czech-Slovak Digital Parliamentary Library

Parliaments of Czechoslovakia
1946 establishments in Czechoslovakia
1948 disestablishments
Constituent assemblies
Defunct unicameral legislatures